Amritpal Singh (born 6 October 1983 in Sangrur, Punjab) was an Indian track and field athlete from Punjab who specialized in long jump. He held the national record from 2004 to 2013.

Career
Singh, with an 8.08 metres jump at the 10th Federation Cup Athletics Championships in New Delhi on 16 March 2004, bettered the 30-year record held by T. C. Yohannan. It was eventually bettered by Kumaravel Premkumar in 2013 with a jump of 8.09 meters.

Singh was one among four Indians to go beyond the eight-metre mark; the others being T. C. Yohannan (in 1974), Sanjay Kumar Rai (in 2000). and Kumaravel Premkumar in 2013. He worked for Punjab Police as an Inspector.

Though Singh had passed the qualifying norm of 8.05 m for the 2004 Athens Olympics, he was left out because of unsatisfactory form and fitness.

Death 
The night of 26 April 2021, Singh died in a road accident near Patti, Punjab. Singh was on a patrolling duty in the border area. Police sources said he was posted as in-charge at the Ghariala police post. He was on patrolling duty regarding illegal mining in the area. He lost control over his vehicle on the Patti-Tarn Taran road near Mahi Resorts Kairon and it hit a roadside tree. He sustained serious injuries and later died.

References

External links

1983 births
Indian male long jumpers
Athletes from Punjab, India
People from Sangrur
Living people
21st-century Indian people